Casalvecchio is an Arbëreshë comune and village in the Province of Foggia, Apulia, southern Italy. Mostly originating from a 15th-century migration of Albanians, the residents have subsisted by family farming. Of those native to the area for generations, many have continued to use Arbëresh, even those of the post–World War II generation.

History
In 1461 near Monte Gargano, in the southeastern Apennine mountains, a group of 5000 immigrants from Albania fled the enculturation of the Ottoman Turks and Islam.  They were sent by the  Albanian leader Skanderbeg. This part of Apulia was granted to the incomers by the king of Naples.

References

Arbëresh settlements
Cities and towns in Apulia